Fearghal Flannery (born 3 January 1991) is an Irish hurler who currently plays as a substitute goalkeeper for the Galway senior team.

Flannery joined the team as sub-goalie to James Skehill during the 2012 championship.  An All-Ireland medalist in the minor grade, Flannery has won one Leinster medal in the senior grade as a non-playing substitute.

Flannery came on in the second half of the 2018 All-Ireland Senior Final for his championship debut to replace the injured James Skehill.

At club level Flannery plays with the Pádraig Pearse's club.

References

1991 births
Living people
Pádraig Pearse's hurlers
Galway inter-county hurlers
Hurling goalkeepers